Troublemaker Studios is a film production company founded and owned by filmmaker Robert Rodriguez and producer Elizabeth Avellán. The company is based in Austin, Texas and is at the former site of the Robert Mueller Municipal Airport. It shares space with Austin Studios, which is managed by the Austin Film Society, and houses production offices, sound stages and the largest green screen in Texas.

The company's visual effects division, Troublemaker Digital, is also located at the site, and uses six-core AMD Opteron processors and FirePro graphics accelerators on many of its productions. A second facility, Troublemaker Sound, is located in the hill country outside Austin. It provides post-production sound and editing facilities, including a mixing and dubbing sound stage powered by a large Pro Tools installation, and a full Avid Unity-based editing system.

In the 1990s and 2000s, it had an alliance with Dimension Films to produce projects for the studio, with most of them becoming hit films and their box office successes. The company made its breakthrough with its first franchise being that of Spy Kids. On August 12, 2021, the company had signed a deal with HBO and HBO Max.

Los Hooligans Productions
The company was founded in 1991 as Los Hooligans Productions, taking its name from Rodriguez's own comic strip, Los Hooligans, which he wrote and illustrated for three years while attending the University of Texas at Austin. Rodriguez chose the name so fans of the strip would recognize it when they saw his films. The company was reincorporated as Troublemaker Studios in 2000.

Los Hooligans Productions filmography:
Bedhead (1991) (short film) (distributed by Columbia Pictures)
El Mariachi (February 26, 1993) (distributed by Columbia Pictures)
Roadracers (July 22, 1994) (distributed by Showtime Network)
Desperado (August 25, 1995) (distributed by Columbia Pictures)
Four Rooms (December 25, 1995) (co-production with A Band Apart; distributed by Miramax Films)
From Dusk Till Dawn (January 19, 1996) (co-production with A Band Apart; distributed by Dimension Films)
The Faculty (December 25, 1998) (distributed by Dimension Films)
From Dusk Till Dawn 2: Texas Blood Money (March 16, 1999) (direct-to-video) (co-production with A Band Apart; distributed by Dimension Films and Buena Vista Home Entertainment)
From Dusk Till Dawn 3: The Hangman's Daughter (January 18, 2000) (direct-to-video) (co-production with A Band Apart; distributed by Dimension Films and Buena Vista Home Entertainment)

Films

Spy Kids (March 30, 2001) (distributed by Dimension Films)
Spy Kids 2: The Island of Lost Dreams (August 7, 2002) (distributed by Dimension Films)
Spy Kids 3-D: Game Over (July 25, 2003) (distributed by Dimension Films)
Once Upon a Time in Mexico (September 12, 2003) (distributed by Columbia Pictures and Dimension Films)
Sin City (April 1, 2005) (distributed by Dimension Films)
The Adventures of Sharkboy and Lavagirl in 3-D (June 10, 2005) (distributed by Dimension Films and Columbia Pictures)
Grindhouse (April 6, 2007) (distributed by Dimension Films)
Planet Terror (co-production with Rodriguez International Pictures)
Death Proof (co-production with Rodriguez International Pictures)
Shorts (August 21, 2009) (co-production with Imagination Abu Dhabi and Media Rights Capital; distributed by Warner Bros. Pictures)
Predators (July 9, 2010) (co-production with Davis Entertainment; distributed by 20th Century Fox)
Machete (September 3, 2010) (co-production with Overnight Productions and Hyde Park Entertainment; distributed by 20th Century Fox and Sony Pictures Releasing International)
The Black Mamba (February 19, 2011) (short film) (co-production with RadicalMedia; distributed by Nike)
Spy Kids: All the Time in the World (August 19, 2011) (distributed by Dimension Films)
The Director's Chair (2014–present) (co-production with Skip Film and FactoryMade Ventures)
Sin City: A Dame to Kill For (August 22, 2014) (co-production with Aldamisa Entertainment, Miramax Films and Solipsist Films; distributed by Dimension Films)
Sock 'Em Dead (2015) (short film) (co-production with Rodriguez International Pictures in association with Happy Socks)
100 Years (2015; releasing in November 18, 2115) (in association with Kouz Production and Moonwalk Films)
Spy Kids: Mission Critical (2018) (co-production with Dimension Television and Mainframe Studios; distributed by Lantern Television)
Alita: Battle Angel (February 14, 2019) (co-production with Lightstorm Entertainment; distributed by 20th Century Fox)
Red 11 (March 15, 2019) (co-production with Double R)
UglyDolls (May 3, 2019) (co-production with Reel FX Animation Studios, Alibaba Pictures, Huaxia Film Distribution and Original Force; distributed by STX Entertainment)
We Can Be Heroes (December 25, 2020) (Under Double R, distributed by Netflix)
Happier Than Ever: A Love Letter to Los Angeles (September 3, 2021) (co-production with Interscope Films, Darkroom Productions, Nexus Studios and Aron Levine Productions; distributed by Disney+)
Hypnotic (co-production with Studio 8 and Hoosegow Productions; distributed by Solstice Studios)
Spy Kids: Armageddon (co-production with Skydance Media and Spyglass Media Group; distributed by Netflix)

Quick Draw Productions

In 2010, Rodriguez launched Quick Draw Productions, a production and financing company that would allow him greater freedom to develop and produce film and television projects. Aaron Kaufman and Iliana Nikolic are his partners in the venture. In 2012, an animation division, Quick Draw Animation, was launched. Both companies are based at Troublemaker Studios.

Quick Draw Productions filmography:
Two Scoops (2013) (short film) (in association with BlackBerry)
Machete Kills (October 11, 2013) (co-production with A.R. Films, Aldamisa Entertainment, Demarest Films, Overnight Productions and 1821 Pictures; distributed by Open Road Films)
The Mandalorian (2020) (co-production with Lucasfilm, Fairview Entertainment and Golem Creations; distributed by Disney Platform Distribution)
The Book of Boba Fett (2021) (co-production with Lucasfilm and Golem Creations; distributed by Disney Platform Distribution)

Rodriguez International Pictures

In 2006, Rodriguez launched Rodriguez International Pictures, a film and television production company that mainly focuses on the horror genre. Its name is an homage to the low-budget production company American International Pictures.

Rodriguez International Pictures filmography:
Curandero: Dawn of the Demon (2005/March 12, 2013) (direct-to-video) (distributed by Dimension Films, Miramax and Lionsgate Home Entertainment)
Grindhouse (April 6, 2007) (distributed by Dimension Films)
Planet Terror (co-production with Troublemaker Studios)
Death Proof (co-production with Troublemaker Studios)
El Mariachi (2014) (co-production with Teleset Colombia and Sony Pictures Television; distributed by Sony Pictures Television International)
From Dusk Till Dawn: The Series (2014–15) (co-production with Sugarcane Entertainment and FactoryMade Ventures; distributed by Miramax and Entertainment One)
Matador (2014) (co-production with K/O Paper Products and FactoryMade Ventures; distributed by Entertainment One)
Lucha Underground (2014–2018) (co-production with MGM Television, FactoryMade Ventures and AG Studios)
Sock 'Em Dead (2015) (short film) (co-production with Troublemaker Studios in association with Happy Socks)

References

External links
 Troublemaker Studios

1991 establishments in Texas
American companies established in 1991
Companies based in Austin, Texas
Entertainment companies based in Texas
Film production companies of the United States
Mass media companies established in 1991
Robert Rodriguez